"Don't Talk Just Kiss" is a song by English pop trio Right Said Fred, released as the second single from their debut album, Up (1992). The song features uncredited duet vocals by American R&B and dance music singer Jocelyn Brown, although she appears in the accompanying music video, which was directed by James Le Bon. It reached number three in the United Kingdom in December 1991 and became a top-10 hit in several international territories. The single was released in the United States on 27 February 1992, peaking at number 76 on the Billboard Hot 100 and number eight on the Billboard Hot Dance Club Songs chart.

Critical reception
AllMusic editor Stephen Schnee described the song as a "delectable slice of '90s disco". J.D. Considine from The Baltimore Sun felt that "there's not enough of the single's goofy charm to sustain disco throwbacks" like "Don't Talk Just Kiss". American magazine Billboard found that singer Richard Fairbrass "has a distinctive baritone voice", adding that he "shines brightest" on the song. An editor, Larry Flick, wrote, "Now that they've proven how "sexy" they are, Fred and friends want you to pucker up...immediately." He also complimented it as "an equally appealing pop/house gem that benefits from a guest vocal from club dynamo Jocelyn Brown" and an "infectious hook". Clark and DeVaney from Cash Box commented, "Who would have ever figured a couple of body builders would cause such a ruckus in the music business?". They added that "Don't Talk Just Kiss" "is actually more of a real song than its predecessor, but still manages to contain enough of a repetitious beat to keep this act in the clubs." 

Andy Kastanas from The Charlotte Observer wrote, "Not only does it borrow its sound from disco of the '70s, but it borrows one of its personalities. Disco diva Jocelyn Brown lends her vocal chords to R.S.F. to make for a rollicking good dance song." Alan Jones from Music Weeks RM Dance Update declared it as "a Seventies-flavoured disco groove allowing Jocelyn plenty of opportunities to ad-lib, which she does in her usual paint-blistering manner." Johnny Dee from Smash Hits called it "another cracker" and "a brilliant pop record — funny catchy, you can do daft dances to it. The lyrics are great too — "Don't talk just kiss/Let your tongue fool around"."

Track listings

 UK CD single 
 "Don't Talk Just Kiss" (7-inch mix)
 "Don't Talk Just Kiss" (Dick's mix)
 "Don't Talk Just Kiss" (Miss Browns Dolly Mixture)
 "Don't Talk Just Kiss" (Beat Nicked mix)

 UK 7-inch single and Australian cassette single 
 "Don't Talk Just Kiss"
 "Don't Talk Just Kiss" (instrumental)

 UK 12-inch single 
A1. "Don't Talk Just Kiss" (Dick's mix)
A2. "Don't Talk Just Kiss" (7-inch mix)
B1. "Don't Talk Just Kiss" (Miss Browns Dolly Mixture)
B2. "Don't Talk Just Kiss" (Beat Nicked mix)

 US CD single 
 "Don't Talk Just Kiss" (7-inch UK version) – 3:13
 "Don't Talk Just Kiss" (7-inch dance mix) – 3:32
 "Don't Talk Just Kiss" (Deep Throat mix) – 4:35
 "Don't Talk Just Kiss" (Suck Face 12-inch mix) – 6:18
 "Don't Talk Just Kiss" (Fredo's vocal dub) – 4:41
 "Don't Talk Just Kiss" (Dick's 12-inch mix) – 7:14

 US cassette single 
 "Don't Talk Just Kiss" (7-inch UK version) – 3:13
 "Don't Talk Just Kiss" (7-inch dance mix) – 3:32

 Australian CD single' 
 "Don't Talk Just Kiss" (7-inch mix)
 "Don't Talk Just Kiss" (Miss Browns Dolly Mixture)
 "Don't Talk Just Kiss" (Dick's mix)

Charts

Weekly charts

Year-end charts

Certifications

Release history

References

1991 songs
1991 singles
1992 singles
Charisma Records singles
Flowered Up songs
Jocelyn Brown songs
Right Said Fred songs
Songs about kissing
Songs written by Richard Fairbrass
Songs written by Fred Fairbrass
Songs written by Rob Manzoli